WFTL is a callsign present on the following stations in South Florida.
WFTL 850 AM. An AM station licensed to West Palm Beach, Florida.

WFTL was also the callsign of these formerly co-owned stations in South Florida.
WFTL 1400 AM. A 1,000 watt AM station licensed to Fort Lauderdale, Florida, now known as WFLL.
WFTL 1420 AM. A station licensed to Delray Beach, Florida now known as WDJA.
WFTL-FM 106.7 FM. A Spanish contemporary station licensed to Fort Lauderdale, Florida now known as WXDJ and before that was an English Easy Listening station named "Joy 107", WJQY.
WFTL-TV Channel 23. The Univision affiliate licensed to Miami, Florida, now known as WLTV.